The women's 5000 metres competition at the 1998 Asian Games in Bangkok, Thailand was held on 18 December at the Thammasat Stadium. This was the first time that this event was contested at the Asian Games replacing the 3000 metres.

Schedule
All times are Indochina Time (UTC+07:00)

Results

References

External links
Results

Women's 05000 metres
1998